Gondi has typically been written in Devanagari script or Telugu script, but native scripts are in existence. A Gond by the name of Munshi Mangal Singh Masaram designed a Brahmi-based script in 1918, and in 2006, a native script that dates up to 1750 has been discovered by a group of researchers from the University of Hyderabad.

Nonetheless, most Gonds are unaware of their well developed language and do not use any script now. The Gunjala Gondi Lipi has witnessed a surge in prominence, and well-supported efforts are being undertaken in villages of northern Andhra Pradesh to widen its usage.

Munshi Mangal Singh Masaram Script 

In 1918, Munshi Mangal Singh Masaram, a Gond from Balaghat district of Madhya Pradesh, designed a script for Gondi based on Brahmi characters found in other descendant Indian scripts. However, this script is not widely used, even though a few publications have been made available by his followers and supporters.

Unicode

Masaram Gondi script was added to the Unicode Standard in June, 2017 with the release of version 10.0.

The Unicode block for Masaram Gondi is U+11D00–U+11D5F:

Gunjala Gondi Lipi 

This script is the subject of ongoing linguistic and historical research. Discovered manuscripts have been dated up to 1750, and discuss information from as early as the 6th–7th centuries. Much of the information reveals independence initiatives by the Gond Rajas and encounters with the British. Also, the names of the days of the week, the months, the Gond festivals have been discovered in this Gondi script.

Unicode

Gunjala Gondi lipi was added to the Unicode Standard in June, 2018 with the release of version 11.0.

The Unicode block for Gunjala Gondi is U+11D60–U+11DAF:

References

External links
 Gondi script

 

Writing systems
Dravidian languages
Languages of Madhya Pradesh